The  is a yakuza organization based in Kagoshima, Kyushu, Japan, with an estimated 60 active members.

The Kozakura-ikka is noted for its unique official policy, which the National Police Agency describes as the "Kozakura Monroe Doctrine", of not allowing themselves to be active outside of Kagoshima Prefecture, and at the same time not allowing any other yakuza syndicate to enter the prefecture.


History
After the era of Takashi Katahira's administration, Fumio Jinguji became the third president in 1969, and Kiei Hiraoka became the fourth president in 1988.

Successive presidents
1st (1948-) : Seizo Osato (大里 清蔵) a.k.a. Kozakura no Tatsu.
2nd : Takashi Katahira (片平 孝)
3rd (1969-): Fumio Jinguji (神宮司 文夫)
4th (1988-): Kiei Hiraoka (平岡 喜榮) who was 1st kumicho of the Hiraoka-gumi.

References

Organizations established in 1948
1948 establishments in Japan
Yakuza groups based in Kyushu